Amor y Suerte: Éxitos Romanticos is the fourth compilation album released by American singer Gloria Estefan, but is the twenty-fifth album overall. It released in 2004. The album was released in some European countries with the alternate title Amor y Suerte: The Spanish Love Songs. It Released internationally by Sony Discos except in Japan where the album was released by Epic Records/Sony Music Japan International. The album was released with a Limited Edition Bonus DVD in the U.S., Europe, and Mexico that contained music videos.

Content

Although many consider this album a greatest hits compilation of Estefan's Spanish language songs, it is just a compilation of Gloria's love songs in Spanish. Most of the songs are number-one singles appearing on Billboard's "Hot Latin Tracks" in the United States.

In 2006, a true compilation of her Spanish greatest hits was released under the name of Oye Mi Canto!: Los Grandes Exitos.

Track listing

Chart positions

Weekly charts

Certifications

Release history

References

External links
Gloria Estefan discography database

2004 compilation albums
Gloria Estefan compilation albums
2004 video albums
2004 live albums
Live video albums